The following is a list of awards and nominations received by British singer-songwriter, pianist, and composer Elton John. Outside of music, John has also received several honourable awards, including a knighthood in 1998.

John has sold over 300 million records worldwide during his six-decade career in music, making him one of the best-selling artists of all time. He has more than fifty Top 40 hits in the UK Singles Chart and US Billboard Hot 100, including nine number ones in the UK and US, as well as seven consecutive number-one albums in the US. His 1973 double album Goodbye Yellow Brick Road and his 1974 Greatest Hits compilation album are among the best-selling albums worldwide. His tribute single "Candle in the Wind 1997", a rewritten version of his 1974 single in dedication to Princess Diana, sold over 33million copies worldwide and is the best-selling chart single of all time. In 2019, John was ranked by Billboard as the top solo artist in US chart history (third overall), and the top Adult Contemporary artist of all time. In 2021, John became the first solo artist with UK Top 10 singles across six decades.

John has received five Grammy Awards, five Brit Awards; including for Outstanding Contribution to Music; two Academy Awards, two Golden Globes, a Tony Award, a Laurence Olivier Award, a Disney Legend Award, and the Kennedy Center Honor. In 2004, Rolling Stone ranked him 49th on its list of 100 influential musicians of the rock and roll era. He was inducted into the Songwriters Hall of Fame in 1992 and the Rock and Roll Hall of Fame in 1994, and is a fellow of The Ivors Academy. He was knighted by Queen Elizabeth II for services to music and charitable services in 1998, and was appointed a member of the Order of the Companions of Honour by King Charles III (then Prince of Wales) in 2020.

John is also known for his work on the stage and film; he wrote the music and lyrics for the Broadway musicals The Lion King (1998), Aida (2000), and Billy Elliot the Musical (2009), and also wrote the songs for the Disney animated film The Lion King (1994). Over his six decade career in music, John has received 34 Grammy Award nominations receiving six wins. He also received the three Tony Award nominations winning for Best Original Score for his work on Broadway for The Lion King in 1998, Aida in 2000, and Billy Elliot the Musical in 2009. For his work on film he received four Academy Award nominations for Best Original Song for "Can You Feel the Love Tonight" from The Lion King (1994), and "I'm Gonna Love Me Again" for Rocketman (2019).

Major associations

Academy Awards

Grammy Awards

Tony Awards

Industry awards

ASCAP Pop Music Awards

!Ref.
|-
| 1987
| "Nikita"
| rowspan=3|Most Performed Songs
| 
| 
|-
| 1989
| "I Don't Wanna Go on with You Like That"
| 
| 
|-
| 1991
| "Sacrifice"
| 
| 
|-
| rowspan=4|1994
| Himself
| Songwriter of the Year
| 
| rowspan=4|
|-
| "The One"
| rowspan=5|Most Performed Songs 
| 
|-
| "The Last Song"
| 
|-
| "Simple Life"
| 
|-
| 1996
| "Believe"
| 
| 
|-
| 1999
| "Something About the Way You Look Tonight"
| 
|

BMI Pop Awards

!Ref.
|-
| rowspan=2|1996
| "Circle of Life"
| rowspan=4|Award-Winning Song
| 
| rowspan=2|
|-
| "Can You Feel the Love Tonight"
| 
|-
| rowspan=2|1999
| "Something About the Way You Look Tonight"
| 
| rowspan=2|
|-
| "Candle in the Wind 1997"
|

Brit Awards

British LGBT Awards

!Ref.
|-
| 2015
| rowspan=2|Himself
| Global Icon
| 
| 
|-
| 2017
| Music Artist
| 
| 
|-
| 2020
| Elton John AIDS Foundation
| Global Impact
| 
|

Classic Rock Roll of Honour Awards

!Ref.
|-
| 2016
| Wonderful Crazy Night
| Album of the Year
| 
|

Golden Globe Awards

Ivor Novello Awards

Juno Awards

MTV Video Music Awards

MVPA Awards

NRJ Music Awards

Žebřík Music Awards
{| class=wikitable
|-
! scope="col" style="width:4em;" | Year
! scope="col" style="width:32em;"| Category
! scope="col" style="width:24em;"| Nominated work
! scope="col" style="width:5em;" | Result
! Ref.
|-
| 2005
| Best International Personality
| Himself
| 
|

Honorable awards 

John was appointed a Commander of the Order of the British Empire (CBE) in 1995. For his charitable work, he was knighted by Queen Elizabeth II on 24 February 1998. In the 2020 New Year Honours, he was appointed Member of the Order of the Companions of Honour (CH) by King Charles III (then Prince Charles) for services to music and to charity.

John was awarded Society of Singers Lifetime Achievement Award in 2005. He received a Kennedy Center Honor in 2004 and a Disney Legends Award in 2006. In 2000, he was named the MusiCares Person of the Year for his artistic achievement in the music industry and dedication to philanthropy. In 2010, he received the PRS for Music Heritage Award, which was erected on The Namaste Lounge Pub in Northwood, London, where John performed his first gig.

In 2019, French President Emmanuel Macron appointed John a chevalier of the Legion of Honour. In 2019, John featured on a series of UK postage stamps issued by the Royal Mail. In 2022, after performing at the White House, United States President Joe Biden surprised John by presenting him with the National Humanities Medal.

References 

Awards
John, Elton